Das Balsas River or Rio das Balsas may refer to several rivers in Brazil:

 Das Balsas River (Bahia)
 Das Balsas River (Maranhão)
 Das Balsas River (Tocantins)

See also